WWE ECW (also known as ECW on Sci-Fi and later ECW on Syfy, simply ECW, and colloquially as WWECW, a portmanteau of both WWE and ECW) is an American professional wrestling television program that was produced by WWE, based on the independent Extreme Championship Wrestling (ECW) promotion that lasted from 1992 to 2001. The show's name also referred to the ECW brand, in which WWE employees were assigned to work and perform, complementary to WWE's other brands, Raw and SmackDown.

ECW debuted on June 13, 2006, on Sci Fi in the United States and Global Television Network in Canada on Saturday mornings and ran until its final episode on February 16, 2010, on the rebranded Syfy. It was replaced the following week with WWE NXT. Every episode is available for on-demand viewing via the WWE Network.

Throughout the shows existence, ECW had been broadcast from over 120 arenas, over 80 cities and towns, and four countries: United States, Canada, United Kingdom, and Italy in 2007.

Show history

Launch on Sci Fi
WWE acquired the rights to Extreme Championship Wrestling (ECW)'s trademarks and video library in 2003 and later began reintroducing ECW through content from the ECW library and a series of books, which included the release of The Rise and Fall of ECW documentary. The enormous popularity of ECW merchandise prompted WWE to organize ECW One Night Stand, an ECW reunion pay-per-view in 2005. The financial and critical success of the event motivated WWE to organize a second One Night Stand the following year. With rejuvenated interest in the ECW product, WWE began exploring the possibility of reviving the promotion full-time. The news that WWE was planning to bring back ECW was leaked in the middle of April as Vince McMahon decided to revive ECW as a full-time brand. Reports beforehand stated that WWE was prepared to bring back ECW immediately after WrestleMania 22.

On May 25, 2006, WWE announced the launch of ECW as a stand-alone brand, congruous to Raw and SmackDown!, with its own show on Sci Fi (now Syfy). Despite initial concerns that professional wrestling would not be accepted by Sci Fi's demographic, network President Bonnie Hammer stated that she believed ECW would fit the channel's theme of "stretching the imagination". Sci Fi (now known as Syfy) is owned by NBC Universal, parent company of USA Network and exclusive cable broadcaster of Raw and Smackdown. ECW's weekly series was originally given a thirteen episode run as a "summer series" on Sci Fi. The premiere received a 2.79 rating, making it the highest rated show on cable in its time slot. Because of its good ratings it was granted an extended run through the end of 2007. On October 23, 2007, the network renewed the series through 2008. Prior to the show's launch, WWE opted to cancel its webcast Velocity and replace it with the new ECW program.

Original format (2006)
ECW was initially produced differently from WWE's other shows. For televised events, the main ring-facing cameras were placed on a different location in the arena while the wrestling ring itself featured an ECW logo on the mat and blank turnbuckle covers. The male performers were referred to "Extremists" instead of "Superstars" while female performers were called "Vixens" rather than Divas. However, the show steadily began being produced following the same format of the other shows. As opposed to the original promotion, match rules, such as count outs and disqualifications, were now standard. Matches featuring the rule set of the original promotion were then classified as being contested under "Extreme Rules" and were only fought when specified.

Former ECW owner Paul Heyman served as the on-air "ECW Representative" (a reference to how Heyman had been identified on Monday Night Raw back in 1997). According to an interview in the UK newspaper The Sun, Heyman wrote the show's weekly scripts and submitted them to writers for possible changes, and then Vince McMahon for final approval. Following December to Dismember, Heyman was relieved from both his on and off-air duties with World Wrestling Entertainment.

Change in format (2007–2010)

While the show started out a ratings success, it began drawing criticism from fans of the original ECW early on. This was most evident by the negative crowd reaction "old school" fans gave the main event of Batista vs. Big Show at the August 1, 2006 show from Hammerstein Ballroom, which often held original ECW events while it was a company. After Heyman left in late 2006, there was no ECW authority figure until August 14, 2007, when Armando Estrada was announced as the General Manager.

On May 6, 2008, ECW celebrated its 100th episode on Sci Fi. On June 3, 2008 Estrada was replaced by Theodore Long as General Manager of ECW. ECW moved to 9:00 p.m. Eastern/8:00 p.m. Central on September 30, 2008. ECW moved back to 10:00 p.m. Eastern/9:00 p.m. Central on May 5, 2009. On the April 7 edition of ECW it was announced that Theodore Long was returning to SmackDown to fulfill the role of General Manager. From this point the Interim General Manager was named as Tiffany who took over as full-time General Manager on the June 30, 2009 episode.
On July 7, 2009, the Sci Fi Channel renamed itself to "Syfy", prompting WWE to rename the show ECW on Syfy to reflect the changes. In 2009 a "superstar initiative" was established for the purpose of introducing new talent to WWE programming, mainly those from WWE's developmental territory Florida Championship Wrestling to ECW's roster.

Cancellation and aftermath
On February 2, 2010, WWE Chairman Vince McMahon announced that ECW would be going off the air and would be replaced with a new weekly program in its slot in which McMahon announced as "groundbreaking, original show."  It was later announced that the show would air its final episode on February 16, 2010. On the February 9, 2010 episode of ECW, the new show's name was announced as WWE NXT.

Online presence
At ECW's launch, WWE.com introduced Hardcore Hangover, a video feature which allowed fans in the United States and Canada to stream or download video footage from the weekly show. On October 16, 2007, it was replaced by a new feature which made full episodes of the show available for streaming on WWE.com the day after they aired. After gathering a list of names from fans and conducting an online poll, the feature was named ECW X-Stream on October 31, 2007. Past episodes of ECW were previously viewable on the video streaming website Hulu, which are available on the WWE Network.

Production

ECW shows were held in large arenas as a part of the taping schedules of WWE's other shows. This was in sharp contrast to the original Extreme Championship Wrestling which ran most of its events in smaller venues. The show generally aired live on Tuesdays directly before — when touring the west coast — or after SmackDown was taped, though it was also recorded and placed on a broadcast delay until later in the night depending on what circumstances dictated.
ECW had originally separated itself from WWE, featuring ECW's old black ring ropes, the ECW logo in the middle of the ring and no WWE logo to be seen on the turnbuckles or on the ring apron. However, they slowly began to become more of a WWE show than prior, when they made the ring ropes silver instead of the black ones and when they went HD, put the WWE logo on the turnbuckles, and the WWE.COM advertising on the left and right side of the ring aprons and removed the ECW logo from the ring.

ECW's initial theme song was "Bodies" by Drowning Pool, which had been used by WWE for Extreme Championship Wrestling before the establishment of the brand. "Don't Question My Heart" by Saliva featuring Brent Smith was later used to open ECW for the rest of the program's run. The songs "Famous" by Puddle of Mudd was used for one week, and a censored version of "This Is The New Shit" by Marilyn Manson was used for a few weeks. On January 22, 2008, ECW began broadcasting in HD, along with a new HD set, which is shared among all three WWE brands.

Special episodes

On-air personalities

Authority figures

Commentators

Ring announcers

Recurring segments

International broadcasters
In addition to being broadcast on Syfy, Mun2, and Universal HD in the United States, ECW was broadcast on a number of channels in many different countries.

See also
List of ECW (WWE) alumni
ECW Hardcore TV
ECW on TNN

Arena Video Game 

 WWE SmackDown vs. Raw 2008  First WWE video game Arena appearance
 WWE SmackDown vs. Raw 2009
 WWE SmackDown vs. Raw 2010
 WWE SmackDown vs. Raw 2011 (Last video game to be released while Arena ECW)

References

External links
 

2006 American television series debuts
2010 American television series endings
ECW (WWE brand)
English-language television shows
Extreme Championship Wrestling
Extreme Championship Wrestling reunions and revivals
WWE
Syfy original programming
Television series by WWE